Wynyard is a former provincial electoral district  for the Legislative Assembly of the province of Saskatchewan, Canada, centered on the town of Wynyard. The district was created before the 3rd Saskatchewan general election in 1912 as "Quill Plains". Renamed "Wynyard" in 1917, the constituency was abolished before the 8th Saskatchewan general election in 1934. It is now part of the Arm River-Watrous and Kelvington-Wadena constituencies.

Members of the Legislative Assembly

Election results

|-

|Conservative
|Alfred E. Bence
|align="right"|940
|align="right"|42.32%
|align="right"|–
|- bgcolor="white"
!align="left" colspan=3|Total
!align="right"|2,221
!align="right"|100.00%
!align="right"|

|-

|Conservative
|John Veum
|align="right"|1,126
|align="right"|29.29%
|align="right"|-13.03

|Independent
|Benjamin Franklin Bray
|align="right"|448
|align="right"|11.65%
|align="right"|–
|- bgcolor="white"
!align="left" colspan=3|Total
!align="right"|3,845
!align="right"|100.00%
!align="right"|

|-

|style="width: 130px"|Independent
|George W. Robertson
|align="right"|2,197
|align="right"|59.03%
|align="right"|+47.38

|- bgcolor="white"
!align="left" colspan=3|Total
!align="right"|3,722
!align="right"|100.00%
!align="right"|

|-

|Independent
|Egill Jensson Laxdal
|align="right"|1,701
|align="right"|38.68%
|align="right"|-20.35
|- bgcolor="white"
!align="left" colspan=3|Total
!align="right"|4,398
!align="right"|100.00%
!align="right"|

|-

|- bgcolor="white"
!align="left" colspan=3|Total
!align="right"|4,160
!align="right"|100.00%
!align="right"|

|-

|Conservative
|John Janusson
|align="right"|1,123
|align="right"|21.55%
|align="right"|-
|- bgcolor="white"
!align="left" colspan=3|Total
!align="right"|5,210
!align="right"|100.00%
!align="right"|

See also
Electoral district (Canada)
List of Saskatchewan provincial electoral districts
List of Saskatchewan general elections
List of political parties in Saskatchewan
Wynyard, Saskatchewan

References
 Saskatchewan Archives Board – Saskatchewan Election Results By Electoral Division

Former provincial electoral districts of Saskatchewan